Stuart Carl Mason (born 25 June 1953) is an English professional golfer.

Mason was born in Buxton, Derbyshire. He won several amateur tournaments before turning professional and becoming something of a journeyman on the European Tour. After twenty years of trying he finally won on tour for the first time in 1994. His biggest successes, however, came after turning 50. He  picked up 25 tournament victories on the European Senior Tour and headed the Order of Merit three times, becoming the leading career money winner on the tour.

Career

Regular career
Mason turned professional in 1973, following an outstanding amateur career playing out of Goring & Streatley Golf Club, and was a rookie on the European Tour the following year. He finished in 67th place on the Order of Merit that year and was recipient of the Sir Henry Cotton Rookie of the Year award. He made the top 100 on the European Tour Order of Merit twenty three years in a row up to 1996, with a best ranking of 19th in 1994. In 1980, he finished tied for 4th with Jack Nicklaus in The Open Championship held at Muirfield.

Despite those successes, Mason only won twice on the European Tour, both times in 1994. His first victory came at the 455th attempt, in the Turespana Masters Open de Andalucia, and the second in the Scottish Open just a few months later. He also won three times on the Safari Circuit in Africa.

European Senior Tour
After a spell working for the PGA European Tour as a tournament referee, he joined the European Seniors Tour on turning fifty. He was immediately successful as a senior, winning four of his first eleven events and topping the Order of Merit in 2003 and 2004. He was Order of Merit runner-up in each of the following two seasons before recapturing top spot in 2007. That year, after winning the European Senior Masters, he surpassed Tommy Horton as the highest career money earner on the European Seniors Tour. The next week he won the PGA Seniors Championship, and went on to finish the 2007 season with earnings of €412,376, a new record for money won in a season on the tour, breaking his previous record of €354,775 set in 2004. In 2010, he won his 23rd EST event, which placed him in a tie with Tommy Horton for the most EST wins. In May 2011, Mason who his 24th event, the OKI Open de Espana Senior. He won his 25th event at the Benahavis Senior Masters in October 2011.

Amateur wins
1973 British Youths Open Amateur Championship

Professional wins (30)

European Tour wins (2)

Safari Circuit wins (2)

Other wins (2)
1975 Lusaka Open
1999 Farmfoods British Par 3 Championship

European Senior Tour wins (25)

European Senior Tour playoff record (3–2)

Playoff record
Champions Tour playoff record (0–1)

Results in major championships

Note: Mason only played in The Open Championship.

CUT = missed the half-way cut
"T" indicates a tie for a place

Team appearances
Professional
World Cup (representing England): 1980
Hennessy Cognac Cup (representing Great Britain and Ireland): 1980 (winners)
UBS Cup (representing the Rest of the World): 2003 (tie), 2004

See also
List of golfers with most European Senior Tour wins

References

External links

English male golfers
European Tour golfers
European Senior Tour golfers
People from Buxton
Sportspeople from Derbyshire
1953 births
Living people